MSC Oliver is one of the largest container vessels (as of May 2015) in the world, together with her sister ships MSC Oscar, MSC Zoe, MSC Maya and MSC Sveva. The vessel was delivered in March 2015 by Daewoo Shipbuilding and Marine Engineering (South Korea). According to the official statement of the CEO of Mediterranean Shipping Company, the ships are part from a bulk order for 20 vessels with same size, which will be used for cost optimizations of the company. With the new ships, the management of MSC are trying to fight the low freight rates and increased capacities of shipping.

Name
The ship is named Oliver after the CEO of MSC, Diego Aporte's nephew.

Construction
MSC Oliver and its sister ships were ordered by MSC in December 2013 and was completed in March 2015. The maiden voyage was planned for the beginning of April 2015 and the ship serves MSC's liner service between Asia and North Europe. MSC Oliver was built in Geoje shipyard of Daewoo Shipbuilding and Marine Engineering (yard number 4278). The container ship is valued at worth of US$140 million.

Design
The total capacity is 19,224 TEU and on board of the vessel there are 1,800 reefer points. According to its owner, the ship has better than 35% lower  emissions per TEU than earlier container ships.

Engineering
The main engine of the container ship MSC Oliver is MAN B&W 11S90ME-C (10.2) with MCR of 62,500 kW at 82.2 rpm and NCR of 56,250 kW at 79.4 rpm. The optimized engineering and propulsion system decrease the fuel consumption and  emissions by over 35% per TEU compared to conventional ships of the company.

Sisterships
MSC Zoe
MSC Oscar
MSC Maya
MSC Sveva

See also
 List of largest container ships
 Largest container shipping companies

References

External links
MSC Oliver at ShipsReview.net
MSC launches MSC Oliver

2015 ships
Container ships
Merchant ships of Panama
Ships built by Daewoo Shipbuilding & Marine Engineering